Glaucopsyche paphos is a small butterfly found in the Palearctic  that belongs to the blues family. It is endemic to Cyprus It is sometimes considered to be a subspecies of Glaucopsyche melanops.

See also
List of butterflies of Europe

References

paphos